Sir John King, 2nd Baronet (born before 1681 – 19 March 1720) was an Anglo-Irish politician.

King was the eldest son of Sir Robert King, 1st Baronet and Frances Gore. He sat in the Irish House of Commons as the Member of Parliament for Boyle between 1695 and 1715. On 1 March 1707 he succeeded to his father's baronetcy.

He married Elizabeth Sankey, daughter of John Sankey and Eleanor Morgan, but the couple had no children. He was succeeded in his title by his younger brother, Sir Henry King, 3rd Baronet.

References

|-

Year of birth unknown
1740 deaths
17th-century Anglo-Irish people
18th-century Anglo-Irish people
Baronets in the Baronetage of Ireland
Irish MPs 1695–1699
Irish MPs 1703–1713
Irish MPs 1713–1714
John
Members of the Parliament of Ireland (pre-1801) for County Roscommon constituencies
Year of birth uncertain